The Republic of Mahabad or the Republic of Kurdistan was a short-lived Kurdish self-governing unrecognized state in present-day Iran, from 22 January to 15 December 1946. The Republic of Mahabad, a puppet state of the Soviet Union, arose alongside the Azerbaijan People's Government, a similarly short-lived unrecognized Soviet puppet state.

The capital of the Republic of Mahabad was Mahabad in northwestern Iran. The state encompassed a small territory, including Mahabad and the adjacent cities of Bukan, Oshnavieh, Piranshahr and Naghadeh. The republic moreover claimed the three cities of Urmia, Khoy and Salmas held by the Azerbaijan People's Government.

Background 
Iran was invaded by the Allies in late August 1941, with the Soviets controlling the north. In the absence of a central government, the Soviets attempted to attach northwestern Iran to the Soviet Union, and promoted Kurdish nationalism. From these factors resulted a Kurdish manifesto that above all sought autonomy and self-government for the Kurdish people in Iran within the limits of the Iranian state. In the town of Mahabad, inhabited mostly by Kurds, a committee of middle-class people supported by tribal chiefs took over the local administration. A political party called the Society for the Revival of Kurdistan (Komeley Jiyanewey Kurdistan or JK) was formed. Qazi Muhammad, head of a family of religious jurists, was elected as chairman of the party. Although the republic was not declared until December 1945, Qazi's committee administered the area for more than five years until the fall of the republic.

In 1946 UNSC passed resolutions 2, 3 and 5, urging and eventually facilitating the removal of Soviet forces still occupying Iran.

Foundation 

In the Iranian province of West Azerbaijan, the Soviet commander at Mīāndoāb summoned the Kurdish chieftains and transported them to Baku in Azerbaijan SSR. There, in late September, 1945, the Prime Minister of the Azerbaijan SSR told them that neither their own nationalist party, the Komala-ye Žīān-e Kordestān, nor the Tūda Party was looked on favorably, that they should seek their goals within Azerbaijani autonomy, and that they should call themselves the Democratic Party of Kurdistan. The Azerbaijan movement, one must keep in mind, was not created solely by Soviet pressures. The Kurds opposed, among other things, the government’s attempts at detribalization. Thus, a concern for identity within their own communal groups seemed logical to both Kurds and Azeris in the aftermath of the Soviet occupation in 1941. On December 10, the Democratic Party took control of East Azerbaijan Province from Iranian government forces, forming the Azerbaijan People's Government. Qazi Muhammad decided to do likewise, and on December 15, the Kurdish People's Government was founded in Mahabad. On January 22, 1946, Qazi Muhammad announced the formation of the Republic of Mahabad. Some of the aims mentioned in the manifesto include:
Autonomy for the Iranian Kurds within the Iranian state.
The use of Kurdish as the medium of education and administration.
The election of a provincial council for Kurdistan to supervise state and social matters.
All state officials to be of local origin.
Unity and fraternity with the Azerbaijani people.
The establishment of a single law for both peasants and notables.

Education 
Education was aimed to be provided for free and to be in Kurdish language. But at the beginning of the republic, the teachers had to translate from the textbooks in Persian language to the Kurdish language. Only at the end of the existence of the republic, textbooks in the Kurdish language were to be distributed to the schools. On the same day, the formation of high school for girls was also announced.

Relationship to the Soviets 

The Republic of Mahabad depended on Soviet support. Archibald Bulloch Roosevelt, Jr., grandson of the former U.S. President Theodore Roosevelt, wrote in 1947 in "The Kurdish Republic of Mahabad" that a major problem of the People's Republic of Mahabad was that the Kurds needed the assistance of the USSR; only with the Red Army did they have a chance. However, the Republic's close relationship with the USSR alienated it from most Western powers, causing them to side with Iran's central government. Qazi Muhammad did not deny that the Soviets funded and supplied his republic, but denied that the Democratic Party of Iranian Kurdistan (KDPI) was a communist party. He portrayed this notion as a lie fabricated by the Iranian military authorities, and added that his ideals differed greatly from those of the Soviets.

Contemporaries – both friends and foes – tended to exaggerate the Soviet role in the Republic of Mahabad. While Kurdish nationalist leaders Abdul Rahman Ghassemlou and Jalal Talabani stressed Soviet friendship and support, others like Robert Rossow, Jr., the American chargé d'affaires in neighboring Azerbaijan, and historian William Linn Westermann branded the republic a Soviet puppet state. This notion was also widespread amongst Kurdish tribal leaders, many of whom disagreed with Qazi's leadership.

The Soviets were however generally ambivalent towards the Kurdish administration. They did not maintain a garrison near Mahabad and also did not have any civil agent of sufficient standing to exercise any great influence. They encouraged Qazi's administration by practical benevolent operations such as providing motor transport, keeping out the Iranian army, and buying the whole of the tobacco crop. On the other hand, the Soviets initially did not like the Kurdish administration's refusal to be absorbed into the larger Democratic Republic of (Persian) Azerbaijan, and discouraged the formation of an independent Kurdish state. Following the fall of Mahabad, they however allowed for the safe passage of Mustafa Barzani and his followers into the Soviet Union.

End 
On 26 March 1946, due to pressure from Western powers including the United States, the Soviets promised the Iranian government that they would pull out of northwestern Iran. In June, Iran reasserted its control over Iranian Azerbaijan. This move isolated the Republic of Mahabad, eventually leading to its destruction.

Qazi Muhammad's internal support eventually declined, especially among the Kurdish tribes who had supported him initially. Their crops and supplies were dwindling, and their way of life was becoming hard as a result of the isolation. Economic aid and military assistance from the Soviet Union was gone, and the tribes saw no reason to support him. The townspeople and the tribes had a large divide between them, and their alliance for Mahabad was crumbling. The tribes and their leaders had only supported Qazi Muhammad for his economic and military aid from the Soviet Union. Once that was gone, many did not see any reason to support him. Other tribes resented the Barzanis, since they did not like sharing their already dwindling resources with them. Some Kurds deserted Mahabad, including one of Mahabad's own marshals, Amir Khan. Mahabad was economically bankrupt, and it would have been nearly impossible for Mahabad to have been economically sound without harmony with Iran.

Those who stayed began to resent the Barzani Kurds, as they had to share their resources with them.

On 5 December 1946, the war council told Qazi Muhammad that they would fight and resist the Iranian army if they tried to enter the region. The lack of Kurdish tribal support however made Qazi Muhammad only see a massacre upon the Kurdish civilians performed by the Iranian army rather than Kurdish rebellion. This forced him to avoid war at all cost.

Ten days later, on 15 December 1946, Iranian forces entered and secured Mahabad. Once there, they closed down the Kurdish printing press, banned the teaching of Kurdish language, and burned all Kurdish books that they could find. Finally, on 31 March 1947, Qazi Muhammad was hanged in Mahabad on counts of treason. At the behest of Archie Roosevelt, Jr., who argued that Qazi had been forced to work with the Soviets out of expediency, U.S. ambassador to Iran George V. Allen urged the Shah not to execute Qazi or his brother, only to be reassured: "Are you afraid I'm going to have them shot? If so, you can rest your mind. I am not." Roosevelt later recounted that the order to have the Qazis killed was likely issued "as soon as our ambassador had closed the door behind him," adding with regard to the Shah: "I never was one of his admirers."

Aftermath 

Mustafa Barzani, with his soldiers from Iraqi Kurdistan, had formed the backbone of the Republic's forces. After the fall of the republic, most of the soldiers and four officers from the Iraqi army decided to return to Iraq. The officers were condemned to death upon returning to Iraq and are today honored along with Qazi as heroes martyred for Kurdistan. Several hundred of the soldiers chose to stay with Barzani. They defeated all efforts of the Iranian army to intercept them in a five-week march and made their way to Soviet Azerbaijan.

See also 
 Mukriyan
 Kurds in Iran
 Azerbaijan People's Government
 Persian Socialist Soviet Republic
 Autonomous Government of Khorasan
 Iran–Russia relations

Notes

References 

"The Republic of Kurdistan: Fifty Years Later", International Journal of Kurdish Studies, 11, no. 1 & 2, (1997).
The Kurdish Republic of 1946, William Eagleton, Jr. (London: Oxford University Press, 1963)
  Moradi Golmorad: "Ein Jahr autonome Regierung in Kurdistan, die Mahabad-Republik 1946–1947" in: Geschichte der kurdischen Aufstandsbewegungen von der arabisch-islamischen Invasion bis zur Mahabad-Republik, Bremen 1992, 
  M. Khoubrouy-Pak: Une république éphémère au Kurdistan, Paris u.a. 2002, 
Archie Roosevelt, Jr., "The Kurdish Republic of Mahabad", Middle East Journal, no. 1 (July 1947), pp. 247–269.
William Linn Westermann, "Kurdish Independence and Russian Expansion", Foreign Affairs, Vol. 24, 1945–1946, pp. 675–686
Kurdish Republic of Mahabad, Encyclopedia of the Orient. 
"The Kurds: People without a country", Encyclopædia Britannica 
 
Meiselas, Susan Kurdistan In the Shadow of History, Random House, 1997. 
 
Yassin, Burhaneddin A., "A History of the Republic of Kurdistan", The International Journal of Kurdish Studies, 11, nos. 1–2 (1997): 115–240.
Yassin, Burhaneddin A., Vision or Reality: The Kurds in the Policy of the Great Powers, 1941–1947, Lund University Press, Lund/Sweden, 1995. ,  Lund University Press. ou  Chartwell-Bratt Ltd.
  Масуд Барзани. Мустафа Барзани и курдское освободительное движение. Пер. А. Ш. Хаурами, СПб, Наука, 2005.
  М. С. Лазарев. Курдистан и курдский вопрос (1923–1945). М., Издательская фирма «Восточная литература» РАН, 2005.
  Жигалина О. И. Национальное движение курдов в Иране (1918–1947). М., «Наука», 1988.
  История Курдистана. Под ред. М. С. Лазарева, Ш. Х. Мгои. М., 1999.
  Муртаза Зарбахт. От Иракского Курдистана до другого берега реки Аракс. Пер. с курдск. А. Ш. Хаурами. М.-СПб, 2003.

External links
The Republic of Kurdistan in Mehabad, Encyclopaedia Kurdistanica.
Kurds at the crossroad

 
Former Kurdish states in Iran
Former countries in the Middle East
Mahabad
History of West Azerbaijan Province
Iran–Soviet Union relations
Cold War history of Iran
20th century in Iran
Kurdish separatism in Iran
Former unrecognized countries
States and territories established in 1946
States and territories disestablished in 1946